Klintaine Parish is an administrative unit of Aizkraukle Municipality in the Vidzeme region of Latvia. As of 2011 population of Klintaine Parish is 855 people.

Towns, villages and settlements of Klintaine Parish 
Alkšņi
Čulkstēni
Dīķīši
Klintaine
Mūrnieki
Rīteri
Salas
Stukmaņi
Sturti
Zemlejas

Parishes of Latvia
Aizkraukle Municipality
Vidzeme